Dahman is a surname. Notable people with the surname include:

 Fatima Dahman (born 1992), Yemeni sprinter
 Mohammed Dahman (born 1959), Syrian footballer

See also
 Dahan (surname)
 Lahman